Awais bin Bashir, also spelled Uways or Owais, was a Muslim from Yemen who lived during the lifetime of the Islamic prophet Muhammad. 

His burial place is in Raqqa, Syria. Although he lived during the lifetime of Muhammad, he never physically met him so he is only honorarily counted among the Companions of the Prophet. 

Among the Tabi‘un he is specially known as Khayr al-Tabi‘een and Sayyid al-Tabi‘een Fi Zamanahu. His memorial shrine is in al-Raqqah, Syria. It was destroyed by ISIS in 2013, and is currently awaiting reconstruction.

Life
Muslim historians agreed Uwais descended from Murad  tribe sub branch. Furthermore, Arabian peninsula local traditions has traced the al-Qarani were a Nisba (onomastics) of Ibb city in Yemen, the place where Uwais born.

Uwais's father, Amir, was a strong believer in Islam. He died when Uwais was still young and Uwais was raised by his mother alone; He never physically met Muhammad, even though he lived in the same era. However, he met Muhammad's companion Umar, and is therefore seen as from among the Tabi'un. Abu Nu'aym al-Isfahani has recorded the strong sense of filial piety by Uwais preoccupied him to leave his mother to meet Muhammad, thus, he sacrificed the chance to reach the rank of companions of the Prophet in effort to take care his elderly mother.

During the caliphate of Umar, according to Usayr ibn Jabir which recorded by Muslim ibn al-Hajjaj, everytime Umar received batch of soldiers volunteer from Yemen to be sent for Muslim conquest of Persia, he always asking if there is Uwais among them, as Umar searching Uwais by relying on a Hadith regarding Uwais will reach him one day, Ibn al-Jawzi recorded that Umar were urged by Muhammad during his life, that someday in the future he should ask Uwais for prayer. In next year after his meeting with Umar, during the Hajj season, it is recorded Umar still remembered and asking any pilgrims from Kufa about the condition of Uwais.

Uwais reside in Kufa around the year 19 AH (640 AD) and participated the battle of Nahavand against the Sassanid army. However, as he became famous in Kufa due to recommendation from Hadith which told by caliph Umar, Uwais moved into unspecified location and lost from the trace of historians.

Uwais appeared again in history during the caliphate of Ali, when majority of medieval scholars recorded Uwais met his demise during the battle of Siffin, while some others reported he was fallen in battle during Muslim conquest of Azerbaijan.

Legacy 
Uwais al-Qarani mainly greatly revered for his historical piety, particularly his legendary filial piety, which prompted Muslim communities in later era expressed their veneration in various ways as Muhammad has giving the glad tiding about his moral and ethic conduct as Mumin. Which bestowed title of Khayr al-Tabi'een or best Tabi'in by Muhammad himself in series of Hadith narration recorded by Sahih Muslim and Kitab al-Wafi bi'l-Wafayat of Safadi. His humility for not seeking fame and his filial piety in history prompted Arabian poets to bestowed him as "Majhul an fi al Ardh, Ma'rufin fi as-Samaa" which translate as "unknown on earth (among humans), but famously acknowledged on heavens (by Allah and His Angels)".

The appraisal of him as the best Tabi'un came from an-Nawawi in his book, Al-Minhaj bi Sharh Sahih Muslim, in a part of commentary of Hadith came from Umar which recorded by Muslim ibn al-Hajjaj which mentioned the prophecy from Muhammad who praised Uwais, despite never having seen him. While ad-Dhahabi praised Uwais as “The ascetic role model, the leader of the Tabi'un in his time". Al-Hakim al-Nishapuri gave short commentary in his book, that Uwais were "the monk of Ummah".

Another virtue that appraised for Uwais are weak hadith of ‘Abdullah ibn Abi’l-Jad‘a’ about the virtue of intercession from Uwais alone were better than whole Banu Tamim, which commentary by Hasan al-Basri that the Hadith were particularly came appraisal for Uwais. In architectural legacy, there was mosque that was named after Uwais in Mosul, Iraq, but it was destroyed in 2014.

In modern time, Muhammad Hassan Haniff asserting the case of Uwais taking care of his mother alone and not migrate to Medina as case to refute the extremist ideology of ISIS, pointing out the conduct of Uwais of not immediately migrate to territory of caliphate and not immediately engage in Jihad during the first years of Islam as he prioritize his elderly mother, which agreed by Muhammad and the companions, as refutation that ISIS ideology were flawed according to Islamic teaching.

Sufi orders 
The Uwaisi form of Islamic mysticism was named after Uwais, as it refers to the transmission of spiritual knowledge between two individuals without the need for physical interaction between them all. For example the contemporary "Silsila Owaisi" order led by Shaykh Banaras Owaisi is active in the United Kingdom.

Meanwhile, there are another Sufi order named Muhamadia Uwaisia Order is blessed to Khawaja Shaykh Muhammad Owais Naqibi Qadri Suharwardi AbuAlAlai Naqshbandi, Chishti Sabri Jahangiri. Shaykh Muhammad Owais was granted permission of Uwaisia silsila directly from Muhammad in his court in Madinah in 1st Shaban 1434 AH (2013 CE) and Muhammad blessed this silsila with the name "Mohammadia Uwaisia" (or "Muhammadia Uwaisia" or "Muhammadiya Uwaisia" or "Muhammdiya Owaisia"; Arabic: محمدئة أُوَيْسئة‎). Last shaykh of silsla Uwaisa was Nūr ad-Dīn 'Abd ar-Rahmān Jāmī (Persian: نورالدین عبدالرحمن جامی‎) (1414-1492 CE)

See also
Destruction of early Islamic heritage sites in Saudi Arabia
Sahabah
Tabi'un

References

External links

 Film on Uwais Al Qarani subtitled by Al-Masumeen.com
 Maktab Tarighat Oveyssi Shahmaghsoudi (School of Islamic Sufism)
 The Extreme Mourning of Uwais al-Qarni
 Islamic Sufism Genealogy, November 2004, Tehran University Publications
 The Uwaisi Transmission of Spiritual Knowledge (Naqshbandi-Haqqani website)
 About Uwais al-Qarni, from "The Children Around the Table of Allah," by Shaykh Muhammad Sa'id al-Jamal ar-Rifa'i
 Uwais Qarni
 

594 births
657 deaths
6th-century Arabs
7th-century Arabs
Oveyssi order
Tabi‘un